Giồng Trôm is a township (thị trấn) and capital of Giồng Trôm District, Bến Tre Province, Vietnam.

References

Populated places in Bến Tre province
Communes of Bến Tre province
District capitals in Vietnam
Townships in Vietnam